Haris Handžić (born 20 June 1990) is a Bosnian professional footballer who plays as a striker for Bosnian Premier League club Leotar.

Club career
Coming through the youth system, Handžić began his senior career at hometown club Sarajevo in 2007. He returned to Sarajevo in 2018, winning multiple two Bosnian Premier League titles and two Bosnian Cups, before leaving in 2021 following his contract's expiration.

On 17 July 2021, Handžić joined Lebanese Premier League side Ahed, to be used in the 2021 AFC Cup.

International career
Handžić played for Bosnia and Herzegovina in an unofficial game against Poland in December 2007; he made his official debut in a June 2008 friendly match against Azerbaijan.

Honours
Lech Poznań
Ekstraklasa: 2009–10
Polish Cup: 2008–09
Polish Super Cup: 2009

Zrinjski Mostar 
Bosnian Premier League: 2017–18

Sarajevo
Bosnian Premier League: 2018–19, 2019–20 
Bosnian Cup: 2018–19, 2020–21

References

External links

1990 births
Footballers from Sarajevo
Living people
Bosnia and Herzegovina footballers
Bosnia and Herzegovina international footballers
Association football forwards
FK Sarajevo players
Lech Poznań players
FK Velež Mostar players
FK Rudar Prijedor players
FC Vaduz players
FK Borac Banja Luka players
FC Ufa players
HNK Rijeka players
Debreceni VSC players
HŠK Zrinjski Mostar players
Al Ahed FC players
FK Radnik Bijeljina players
FK Leotar players
Premier League of Bosnia and Herzegovina players
Ekstraklasa players
Swiss Challenge League players
Russian Premier League players
Croatian Football League players
Nemzeti Bajnokság I players
Bosnia and Herzegovina expatriate footballers
Bosnia and Herzegovina expatriate sportspeople in Poland
Bosnia and Herzegovina expatriate sportspeople in Liechtenstein
Bosnia and Herzegovina expatriate sportspeople in Russia
Bosnia and Herzegovina expatriate sportspeople in Croatia
Bosnia and Herzegovina expatriate sportspeople in Hungary
Bosnia and Herzegovina expatriate sportspeople in Lebanon
Expatriate footballers in Poland
Expatriate footballers in Liechtenstein
Expatriate footballers in Russia
Expatriate footballers in Croatia
Expatriate footballers in Hungary
Expatriate footballers in Lebanon